The Coralline Oolite Formation is a limestone formation of Oxfordian (Upper Jurassic) age, found in the Cleveland Basin of North Yorkshire, England.

Coral Rag Member 

The rock forms some of the hills around Oxford and was once used as building stone. Coral rag can be seen in some of the oldest buildings in that city, including the Saxon tower of St Michael at the Northgate, St George's Tower of Oxford Castle and the mediaeval walls of the city.

Hambleton Oolite Member 
This ooidal limestone lies above either the Yedmandale Member or the Lower Calcareous Grit Formation. It is overlain by either the Middle Calcareous Grit or Malton Oolite Members. It is distinguished from the latter by its smaller grain-size and poorer sorting.

Vertebrate paleofauna

Dinosaurs 
The following dinosaurs were reported from the formation, with many of them reidentified.

References 

Geologic formations of England
Jurassic System of Europe
Jurassic England
Limestone formations
Shallow marine deposits
Paleontology in England
Oxfordian Stage